The Ledgewood Historic District is a historic district located in the Ledgewood section of  Roxbury Township, Morris County, New Jersey. The district was added to the National Register of Historic Places on April 18, 2013 for its significance in architecture and community development. It includes 40 contributing buildings, 4 contributing structures, and one contributing site.

Gallery of contributing properties

See also
National Register of Historic Places listings in Morris County, New Jersey

References

External links
  Summary page
  curator of museums at Drakesville Historic Park

Roxbury Township, New Jersey
National Register of Historic Places in Morris County, New Jersey
Historic districts on the National Register of Historic Places in New Jersey
New Jersey Register of Historic Places
Italianate architecture in New Jersey
Colonial Revival architecture in New Jersey
Queen Anne architecture in New Jersey